Edward Peck may refer to:
 Edward Armour Peck (1858–1947), member of the Canadian House of Commons
 Sir Edward Peck (British diplomat) (1915–2009), British ambassador to various countries, climber and author
 Edward Peck (American diplomat) (born 1929), retired career United States diplomat
 Edward Peck (academic administrator), vice-chancellor of Nottingham Trent University